Jodi Shelton born April 3, 1965 is the co-founder and Chief Executive Officer (CEO) of the Global Semiconductor Alliance (GSA).

In 2018, with the inaugural Rising Women of Influence Award, Shelton launched the GSA Women's Leadership Initiative (WLI). The vision of the Initiative is to significantly increase the number of women in leadership roles in the industry, the capital dedicated to women-led start-ups, and the number of STEM-focused female candidates joining the industry. The Women's Leadership Initiative is led by the Women's Leadership Council, harnessing the leadership of those women who have risen to the top ranks of the semiconductor industry to provide inspiration and sponsorship for the next generation of female leaders. The Council is co-chaired by Vicki Mealer-Burke, Chief Diversity Officer & VP, Human Resources, Qualcomm Incorporated and Debora Shoquist, Executive VP, Operations, NVIDIA.

Shelton is also founder, president and CEO of the Shelton Group, which was also founded in 1994, originally as an investor relations (IR) firm. In 1997, she broadened Shelton Group’s practice to include public relations (PR). The PR division closed in 2013 and restarted in 2019.

Early career
She began her career at Cyrix Corporation. Cyrix was sold to California-based National Semiconductor, which in turn sold it to a Korean concern.

Global Semiconductor Alliance

Jodi Shelton is the co-founder and CEO of the Global Semiconductor Alliance (GSA), which was founded in 1994 as the Fabless Semiconductor Association. Shelton is also the founder and CEO of Shelton Group.

In her role with GSA,  is often a keynote speaker at high-level financial and industry conferences, providing insight on key topics pertaining to the global semiconductor and electronics industries. She was invited to ring the closing bell on NASDAQ in 2006, 2007, 2010 and 2011.

Shelton created the Alliance which consists of 250 corporate members from across the globe.

GSA’s leadership groups, include:
 GSA Board of Directors
 Asia Pacific Leadership Council
 Europe / Middle East / Africa (EMEA) Leadership Council
 Women's Leadership Council
 CxO Councils

Philanthropic history
Shelton is also supportive of several philanthropic organizations, and has served on the board of various organizations.

Shelton has also been involved with the BuildOn organization and has made trips to Haiti with the organization. Learn more about BuildOn and young women benefiting from the organization.

Shelton was one of the founding members of the Yellowstone Club’s Ad-Hoc Committee. The Committee was composed of business leaders who had a personal, vested interest in the Club’s success.

Jitrois

Shelton joined forces with French leather company Jitrois to open a New York boutique in mid-February 2015 at 959 Madison Avenue. The boutique ceased operations in 4Q 2019. The leather clothing line is available online and in 18 countries .

PopStyleTV
Fashion Network.
Women's Wear Daily

Personal life

Shelton's eyes were the subject of artist Norbert Brunner's piece "Eye Object / Magic Mirror" displayed in Guerlain, Paris.

Shelton earned her bachelor's degree in political science from San Diego State University, and a master's degree in political science from the University of Houston.

Various Mentions in the Press and By-line Articles
NPR, "Shortage Of Computer Chips Forces Automakers To Curtail Production" - Camila Domonoske

ECN, "The Tinker's Toolbox - A talk with Jodi Shelton of the Global Semiconductor Alliance"- Alix Paultre

TMCnet,  "Global Semiconductor Association Co-Founder Talks with TMCnet about the Industry" - Carrie Schmelkin

Chip Design, "Why 'Global?'"- Jodi Shelton

EE Times, “Viewpoint: Semi Companies will Survive, Thrive” – Jodi Shelton
 
Enterprising Women, “Expanding Business Horizons Within the Chinese Market” – Jodi Shelton
 
wsRadio.com, “Being a Woman Executive in High Tech” – Jodi Shelton
 
IEEE Solid-State Circuits Magazine, “Look, Ma - No Fabs!” – Jodi Shelton and Robert Pepper

The Why Not Now? Podcast with Amy Jo Martin, "Episode 277: Jodi Shelton - Driving Innovation Through Alliance" on iTunes, Spotify - Amy Jo Martin & Jodi Shelton

References

Living people
Year of birth missing (living people)
San Diego State University alumni
University of Houston alumni